1081 Reseda is a dark background asteroid from the outer regions of the asteroid belt. It was discovered on 31 August 1927, by astronomer Karl Reinmuth at the Heidelberg-Königstuhl State Observatory in southwest Germany. It was named after the herbaceous plant Reseda.

Orbit and classification 

Reseda is a non-family asteroid of the main belt's background population when applying the hierarchical clustering method to its proper orbital elements. It orbits the Sun in the outer asteroid belt at a distance of 2.7–3.6 AU once every 5 years and 6 months (1,997 days; semi-major axis of 3.10 AU). Its orbit has an eccentricity of 0.15 and an inclination of 4° with respect to the ecliptic. The body's observation arc begins at Heidelberg in September 1927, or 26 days after its official discovery observation.

Naming 

This minor planet was named after the herbaceous plant Reseda (also known as "weld", "dyer's rocket" and "bastard rocket") a genus of Old World herbs of the mignonette family. The official naming citation was mentioned in The Names of the Minor Planets by Paul Herget in 1955.

Reinmuth's flowers 

Due to his many discoveries, Karl Reinmuth submitted a large list of 66 newly named asteroids in the early 1930s. This list also contained a sequence of 28 asteroids, starting with 1054 Forsytia, that were all named after plants, in particular flowering plants (also see list of minor planets named after animals and plants).

Physical characteristics 

Reseda is an assumed carbonaceous C-type asteroid.

Rotation period 

In August 2008, a rotational lightcurve of Reseda was obtained from photometric observations. Lightcurve analysis gave a well-defined rotation period of 7.3002 hours with a brightness amplitude of 0.34 magnitude.

Poles 

A 2016-published lightcurve, using modeled photometric data from the Lowell Photometric Database, gave a concurring period of 7.30136 hours, as well as two spin axis of (92.0°, −69.0°) and (256.0°, −76.0°) in ecliptic coordinates (λ, β).

Diameter and albedo 

According to the surveys carried out by the Japanese Akari satellite and the NEOWISE mission of NASA's Wide-field Infrared Survey Explorer, Reseda measures between 31.60 and 40.462 kilometers in diameter and its surface has an albedo between 0.0326 and 0.09. The Collaborative Asteroid Lightcurve Link derives an albedo of 0.0488 and a diameter of 37.97 kilometers based on an absolute magnitude of 11.0.

References

External links 
 Lightcurve Database Query (LCDB), at www.minorplanet.info
 Dictionary of Minor Planet Names, Google books
 Asteroids and comets rotation curves, CdR – Geneva Observatory, Raoul Behrend
 Discovery Circumstances: Numbered Minor Planets (1)-(5000) – Minor Planet Center
 
 

001081
Discoveries by Karl Wilhelm Reinmuth
Named minor planets
19270831